The North Florida Ospreys represent the University of North Florida (UNF) in men's college basketball. The Ospreys compete in the ASUN Conference (A-Sun) in Division I of the National Collegiate Athletic Association (NCAA). They play home games at UNF Arena on the school's campus in Jacksonville.

The program was founded in 1992 in the NAIA. They entered NCAA Division II the following season. The Ospreys transitioned into NCAA Division I from 2005 to 2009. Their current head coach is Matthew Driscoll.

History
The North Florida Ospreys men's basketball team played its first games in the 1992–93 season, spending their first year as a National Association of Intercollegiate Athletics (NAIA) Independent. UNF initially had no basketball court, so the Ospreys' first three home games were played at Florida Community College at Jacksonville until UNF Arena was finished in 1993. Their first coach was Rich Zvosec. In the 1993–94 season UNF transitioned into NCAA Division II, joining the Sunshine State Conference. In 1997–98 the Ospreys switched over to the Peach Belt Conference, also in Division II. After six seasons, Zvosec was succeeded as head coach by former National Basketball Association (NBA) player Sidney Green. In 1999, Matt Kilcullen became the team's third head coach.

In 2005, UNF began its transition into NCAA Division I competition, joining the Atlantic Sun Conference (A-Sun). The four-year transition period, 2005–2009, was difficult for the Ospreys, who compiled a record of 20–96, a substantially worse record than the Ospreys had faced in their previous six seasons under Coach Kilcullen. In 2009, new athletic director, Lee Moon, relieved Kilkullen of his position and replaced him with former Baylor University assistant coach Matthew Driscoll for the Ospreys' first year as full Division I members. The Ospreys improved under Driscoll, who led them to their first conference tournament appearance in the 2009–2010 season. In the 2011 A-Sun tournament the Ospreys upset Jacksonville and East Tennessee State to advance to the championship game, but were defeated 87–46 by Belmont. The game was UNF's first to be nationally televised.

In the 2014–15 season, the Ospreys made their first ever appearance in the NCAA Division I tournament by winning the Atlantic Sun tournament for the first time.  On December 6, 2014, they defeated the Purdue Boilermakers on the road, marking their first ever victory over a Big Ten Conference opponent. They also won the Atlantic Sun regular season title for the first time and posted the best record in team history with 23 wins and 11 losses.  As a No. 16 seed in the NCAA tournament, they were defeated by fellow No. 16 seed Robert Morris in the First Four in Dayton, Ohio.  Nevertheless, the Ospreys drew unprecedented media attention both locally and nationally.

Their success continued as the 2015–16 Ospreys began the season with a 93–81 upset at Illinois.  It was the program's second win over a Big Ten Conference opponent.

Head coaches

Facilities
The Ospreys' home venue is UNF Arena. Also the home to the UNF women's basketball and volleyball teams, it opened in 1993 and has a capacity of 5,800. The facility is slated to undergo upgrades and additions as part of UNF's Varsity Village program.

Rivalries
North Florida's most notable rivalry is with crosstown opponents the Jacksonville University Dolphins. The two universities contest the "River City Rumble", in which the school with the most wins annually over the other across all sports receives a trophy, the SunTrust Old Wooden Barrel.

The first game between North Florida and Jacksonville was played on November 23, 2004 when JU defeated UNF, a Division II program, 78–73.  The Ospreys' first win over their crosstown rival came on January 25, 2006 by a score of 90–78.  The series record was 8–1 in favor of JU through the 2008–09 season, when UNF completed their transition to Division I.

After beginning their Division I era 0–5 against the Dolphins, UNF finally defeated JU in the 2011 A-Sun Tournament quarterfinals in one of the young program's most significant wins. Since then, the Ospreys have held the edge, bringing the all-time series record to 15–10 in favor of JU after the 2015–16 season. However, UNF leads the series 9–7 since UNF became a full Division I member.

Year-by-year results

Notes

Postseason

NCAA Division I tournament results
The Ospreys earned their first invitation to the NCAA Division I men's basketball tournament in 2015 as a #16 seed in the South Region. They lost to Robert Morris, giving them a tournament record of 0–1.

NIT results
The Ospreys earned their first bid to the National Invitation Tournament in 2016.  Due to renovations at the O'Connell Center, the Ospreys hosted Florida at the UNF Arena.

Conference tournament results
In seven appearances in the Atlantic Sun men's basketball tournament, the Ospreys have an overall record of 9–8. They won their first Atlantic Sun Tournament championship in 2015.

Conference championships
The Ospreys won the Atlantic Sun regular season championship for the first time in the 2014–15 season and won their second in a row the following season.

References

External links
 

 
Basketball teams established in 1992
1992 establishments in Florida